Uncle Sam is the nickname for the largest diamond ever discovered in the United States. It was found in 1924 in Murfreesboro, Arkansas, at the Prairie Creek pipe mine, which later became known as the Crater of Diamonds State Park. The diamond was named "Uncle Sam" after the nickname of its finder, Wesley Oley Basham, a worker at the Arkansas Diamond Corporation. 

The rough diamond as originally discovered weighed 40.23 carats (8.046 g). It was faceted twice by Schenck & Van Haelen of New York, which specialized in Arkansas diamonds, handling over 14,000. The company described those diamonds as being so hard that they could only be cut using powder of other Arkansas diamonds. The final result was a 12.42-carat (2.484 g) emerald-cut gem. It was characterized as M on the diamond color scale; this nominally corresponds to a faint yellow color, but the visual impression of Uncle Sam has been variously described as white or slight pink. Judging from the color, the diamond is most likely of pure IIa diamond type meaning the number of impurities it has is only a few  parts per million. The clarity of the stone was assessed as VVS1, which stands for Very Very Slightly Included and means the stone has minute non-diamond inclusions that are difficult for a skilled grader to see under 10x magnification.

The diamond was owned by the Peikin Jewelers of Fifth Avenue, New York. It was lent by Peikin to the American Museum of Natural History for temporary display and storage.

It was later acquired by Peter Buck, who donated it to the Smithsonian Museum of Natural History in June of 2022. It is displayed alongside the Canary Diamond, an uncut stone found at the Arkansas site in 1917. 

The discovery of Uncle Sam arguably rescued the Arkansas Diamond Corporation, which had a debt over $276,470 (equivalent to $ million in ) by that time and was going to be shut down in the winter of 1924. The number of diamonds found on the surface was decreasing, and the cost of digging operations was estimated as higher than the expected diamond recovery. Not that the value of the diamond was sufficient to cover the debts, but the discovery lifted the spirits enough to keep the surface operations. Currently, the Crater of Diamonds State Park in Arkansas is the only public diamond mine in the world. Over 33,000 diamonds have been found there since the opening of the park in 1972. The place where Uncle Sam was discovered is marked, and many additional diamonds have been found there.

See also
 Crater of Diamonds State Park
 List of diamonds

References

External links
Images of the Uncle Sam diamond at the ThinkQuest online library.
Another image of the Uncle Sam diamond at the Encyclopedia of Arkansas.

1924 in Arkansas
Pike County, Arkansas
Diamonds originating in the United States
Individual diamonds